Elephants Delicatessen is a local delicatessen and catering company based in Portland, Oregon, in the United States, established in 1979. Its flagship store is located on Northwest 22nd Avenue.

History
Elaine and Jake Tanzer founded the company in April 1979.

Co-owner Anne Weaver is chief executive officer, as of 2013. Scott Weaver is executive chef, as of 2019.

Elephants had 439 employees, as of 2019. The business joined the Energy Trust of Oregon's Strategic Energy Management cohort to assess energy usage, identify waste, and strategize on gas emissions reduction. 

In 2020, Elephants joined the Rose City Downtown Collective, a group of downtown businesses seeking to rebuild the area following a downturn caused by the pandemic and George Floyd protests. The company is among the largest women-owned businesses headquartered in Oregon and Southwest Washington, as of 2021.

Kim Stafford has a writing shed with a wall made of boards from the original Elephants.

Locations
Elephants Delicatessen's flagship store is located at 115 Northwest 22nd Avenue. Other locations:

 Flying Elephants at Fox Tower (812 SW Park Avenue), Director Park
 Flying Elephants at PDX Airport (7000 NE Airport Way)
 Flying Elephants at Kruse Way (5885 SW Meadows Road) - Now Closed
 Elephants Lake Oswego (3970 Mercantile Dr, Lake Oswego, OR)
 Flying Elephants at Montgomery Park (2701 NW Vaughn Street)
 Elephants Delicatessen Central Kitchen (1611 SE 7th Avenue)
 Elephants Catering and Events (700 SE Clay Street)

The Elephants on Corbett (5221 SW Corbett Avenue) opened in 2013, becoming the first location to serve brunch.

Reception
Elephants was included in The Oregonian's "Top Workplaces" list of "99 great places to work" in Oregon and Southwest Washington. In 2020, Elephants won in the Best Catering Service category of Willamette Week annual Best of Portland Readers' Poll. The company ranked number 24 in Oregon Business 2021 list of "100 Best Green Workplaces in Oregon".

See also
 List of delicatessens

References

External links

 
 Elephants Delicatessen at NW 22nd Ave at Zomato

1979 establishments in Oregon
Catering and food service companies of the United States
Delicatessens in Oregon
Food and drink companies based in Portland, Oregon
Regional restaurant chains in the United States
Restaurants established in 1979